Famintsyn is the name of noble family of Scottish origin. Descendants  descents of Kristof Tobias Tomson-Hominsky, first in the service of the Polish–Lithuanian Commonwealth later a soldier in Russian service.

Notable members 
Andrei Famintsyn (1835, Moscow – 1918, Petrograd) was a Russian botanist, public figure, and academician of the Petersburg Academy of Sciences (1884). Grand-grand-grandson of Egor Famintsyn, an Ober-Commandant of the Petropavlovkaya Fortress.
Alexander Famitsin (ru) ((1841 — 1896) was a renowned Russian musical writer, critic and musicologist, professor at Saint Petersburg Conservatory, pupil of Ignaz Moscheles, Moritz Hauptmann and Ernst Richter and friend of Alexander Serov.

References

Russian noble families
Russian families of Scottish origin